European Film Award for Best Sound Designer has been awarded annually by the European Film Academy. The category was first presented in 2013, though before several sound designers were nominated for special awards.

Winners and nominees

2000s

2010s

2020s

References

External links 
 Nominees and winners at the European Film Academy website

Best Sound Designer
Awards established in 2013
2013 establishments in Europe